"BTD (Before the Dawn)" is a song released by the South Korean boy band Infinite. The song is the second track of the group's second EP Evolution, released on January 6, 2011. A Japanese version of the song served as their debut single in Japan. It was released on November 19, 2011 in 3 different editions.

Promotions
Promotions for the song began on January 7, 2011 on KBS's show Music Bank and as well as on MBC's Music Core, SBS's Inkigayo and Mnet's M! Countdown. The song "Hysterie" was also used for the group's comeback performances. Promotions for "BTD" ended on February 27.

Music video
The teaser for the music video was released on December 29, 2010 and the full video was released on January 6, 2011, along with the EP. Before the release of the music video, the teaser had some controversy because of its suggestive violent content. After the release of the full video, it was given a +19 rating due to being too violent for minors. The group's agency, Woollim Entertainment, stated that its intention was to visualize the inner conflict of the characters in the video, and not to display gratuitous violence. Infinite released a dance version of the music video on January 17.

Track listing
Japanese "TSUTAYA" rental single:
 "BTD (Before the Dawn)" – 3:03
 "BTD (Before the Dawn)" (Music video)

Charts

Japanese version

A Japanese version of the song was chosen as the group's debut single in Japan. It was released on November 19, 2011 in 2 limited editions (CD+Photobook and CD+DVD) and CD only regular edition.

Composition
"BTD (Before the Dawn)" is a Japanese version of the song originally recorded in Korean. The B-side "Can U Smile (Remake)" is a ballad version of the song "Can U Smile", previously released on the EP Evolution.

Music video
The music video of the song is the same as the Korean version. It was released on November 16 on MTV Japan.

Track listing

Charts

Oricon chart

Other Charts

Release history

References

2011 songs
Korean-language songs
Japanese-language songs
South Korean songs
Infinite (group) songs